The Bettendorf Community School District Is a public school district in Scott County, Iowa.  The school district covers  that includes the western, northern and central areas of Bettendorf, where it is based, and a small section of the east edge of Davenport.

Founded in 1907, the Bettendorf School District operates nine school buildings, all in the city of Bettendorf.

List of schools
High School
Bettendorf High School

Alternative School
Thomas Edison Academy

Middle School
Bettendorf Middle School

Elementary Schools
Grant Wood
Herbert Hoover
Mark Twain
Neil Armstrong
Paul Norton

References

External links
 Bettendorf Community School District - Official site

School districts in Iowa
Education in Scott County, Iowa
School districts established  in 1907
1907 establishments in Iowa